Veselinka Malinska (Kumanovo, January 4, 1917 – Skopje, November 12, 1987) was a Macedonian Communist, feminist, participant in World War II in Yugoslavia and prominent member of the Women's Antifascist Front of Macedonia.

She became a member of the League of Communists of Yugoslavia in 1936. After the beginning of the National Liberation struggle, Malinska came to Macedonia in May 1942. As Secretary of the Local Committee of Skopje, after the death verdict of the Bulgarian occupation court in 1942, before joining the partisan detachments she hid in Tanushevci and other Albanian villages. She participated in the first session of the Anti-fascist Assembly for the National Liberation of Macedonia.

She was a director of Radio Skopje from April 1, 1952, to November 25, 1961.

References

1917 births
1987 deaths
Macedonian communists
Women in World War II
Politicians from Skopje
Socialist feminists